The North Fork John Day River is a  tributary of the John Day River in the U.S. state of Oregon. It flows generally west to the community of Dale on U.S. Route 395, then southwest through the city of Monument to the unincorporated community of Kimberly, where it meets the main stem of the John Day River.

The upper reaches of the river flow through the North Fork John Day Wilderness in the Wallowa–Whitman National Forest and the Umatilla National Forest. From its headwaters to its confluence with Camas Creek, the river is part of the National Wild and Scenic River system.

The North Fork John Day River is one of the most important in northeast Oregon for anadromous fish. Wildlife found near the river includes mule deer, elk, and black bears, peregrine falcons, and bald eagles. Recreational uses include hunting, fishing, horseback riding, hiking, snowmobiling, skiing, camping, and whitewater rafting.

See also
 List of rivers of Oregon
 List of longest streams of Oregon
 List of National Wild and Scenic Rivers

References

External links

Wild and Scenic North Fork John Day River: U.S. Forest Service

Rivers of Oregon
Wild and Scenic Rivers of the United States
Rivers of Grant County, Oregon
Umatilla National Forest
Wallowa–Whitman National Forest